John Henry McQueen (June 24, 1916 – December 14, 1977) was an American Negro league outfielder in the 1940s.

A native of Monticello, Florida, McQueen made his Negro leagues debut in 1944 with the Indianapolis–Cincinnati Clowns. The following season, he played for the New York Black Yankees. McQueen died in Tampa, Florida in 1977 at age 61.

References

External links
 and Seamheads

1916 births
1977 deaths
Indianapolis Clowns players
New York Black Yankees players
20th-century African-American sportspeople